A sea lion is an aquatic mammal generally found in shallow waters.

Sea Lion, Sealion, Sea-lion, or Sea Lions may also refer to:

Music
Sea Lion (album), by The Ruby Suns, 2008
"Sea Lion" (song), by Sage Francis, 2005

Military
 Operation Sea Lion, the planned German invasion of Great Britain during World War II
 Operation Sea Lion (wargame), a 1974 wargame to test the World War II scenario
 HMS Sealion, two submarines and one land base of the British Royal Navy
 USS Sealion, two U.S. Navy submarines
 NH90 Sea Lion, the German Navy variant of the NHIndustries NH90 helicopter

Places
 Sea Lion Glacier, Antarctica
 Sea Lion Tarn, a tarn (mountain lake or pool) adjacent to the glacier
 Sea Lion Caves, Oregon, United States
 Sea Lion Island, one of the Falkland Islands
 Sea Lion Rock, near Kamchatka Peninsula, Russia

Other
The Sea Lion, a 1921 American silent film
Sea-lion, in heraldry, a mythical creature consisting of the head and front limbs of a lion with the tail of a fish
Supermarine Sea Lion, a series of British racing flying boats
Sea Lion (locomotive), a steam locomotive on the Groudle Glen Railway
Sea Lion (battery-electric locomotive), a 1920s locomotive on the Groudle Glen Railway
Sea Lion Park, an amusement park on Coney Island between 1895 and 1903
Sealioning, a form of Internet trolling